Blackett Creek is a river in Thunder Bay District, Ontario, Canada.

See also
List of rivers of Ontario

References

Rivers of Thunder Bay District